Edward John Hazlett  (21 July 1938 – 16 December 2014) was a New Zealand rugby union player. A prop, Hazlett represented Southland at a provincial level, and was a member of the New Zealand national side, the All Blacks, in 1966 and 1967. He played 12 matches for the All Blacks including six internationals.

Hazlett went on to establish Slinkskins Ltd, a Southland-based tanning company, in 1968, and in the 1996 Queen's Birthday Honours he was appointed a Member of the New Zealand Order of Merit, for services to export.

References

1938 births
2014 deaths
Rugby union players from Invercargill
People educated at Christ's College, Christchurch
New Zealand rugby union players
New Zealand international rugby union players
Southland rugby union players
Rugby union props
New Zealand businesspeople
Members of the New Zealand Order of Merit